Kian Speirs (born 22 May 2004) is a Scottish professional footballer who plays as a midfielder for Stenhousemuir, on loan from Motherwell.

Club career
Speirs made his debut for Motherwell on the opening day of the 2022–23 season, coming off the bench to replace Sean Goss in a 1-0 vicotry over St Mirren 31 July 2022. On 21 January 2023, Speirs joined Stenhousemuir on loan for the rest of the season.

Career statistics

References

2004 births
Living people
Scottish footballers
Association football midfielders
Motherwell F.C. players
Stenhousemuir F.C. players
Scottish Professional Football League players